Longridge railway station was the original terminus of the Wilsontown, Morningside and Coltness Railway (WM&CR) that served the nearby village of Longridge in West Lothian and it was also referred to as Eastern station and was   from Morningside station.

The first station opened as the then terminus of the line at Longridge in 1845 and was then closed in 1848. The railway was extended to Bathgate on a different alignment that diverted the route to the north where a new station (55.833977, -3.673023), a simple platform, was opened in May 1850 but closed in December 1852.

This made Longridge one of the few purely Scotch gauge stations to have existed as it closed before the gauge was converted.

The later Longridge station of 1850 had a single short platform that was accessed off the A706 Longridge to Breich road and stood just to the west of the railway overbridge.

Services
The line was worked by steam although the early intention may have been to work the line as a horse drawn waggonway with independent hauliers.

Passenger services had started from 1845 and a road coach ran between Edinburgh to Longridge from 16 May 1846, passengers disembarking travelling on by train to Townhead. In 1847 two hours was the railway section of the journey, calling at all the stations on the Wilsontown line.

The Caledonian Railway opened its line from Carlisle to Garriongill Junction in 1848 and its trains then ran through to Glasgow over the WM&CR. The demands on the line's capacity may led to the WM&CR passenger service being terminated at this time before being reinstated for a short time a few years later.

Station infrastructure

A Government inspector recorded that at opening that at the eastern end, "the line terminates in a large field, about a mile from a small village called Whitburn" and that no passenger shelters of waiting rooms were provided.

The OS map indicates that the original station had a single platform with a goods yard that had at least one siding and a well. Two buildings were located in the goods yard.

The 1905 OS map shows a large and a smaller building at the site of the junction of the later line to Bathgate with a short stub with a set of buffers running towards the old station site. The over bridge here was reached by two long embankments to achieve enough height for a road bridge over the line. The two buildings mentioned were not present in although the short stub of line into the station was present.

The later station had a single short platform that was accessed off the A706 on the Longridge side and appears to only have had a pedestrian access with no goods yard or sidings. In 1905 the platform and access are still marked.

In 2015 the site of the terminus station remains undeveloped and is mainly occupied by small forestry plantations. The overbridge on the line towards Morningside has been removed as has the railway bridge at the later station. No buildings remain on the original site although the earthworks for the platform etc. are still apparent.

See also
 Breich railway station
 Crofthead railway station
 Headless Cross railway station

References
Notes

Sources

Cobb, M.H. (2003). The Railways of Great Britain -- A Historical Atlas. Shepperton : Ian Allan Publishing Limited. .
Thomas, John (1984) revised J S Paterson, A Regional History of the Railways of Great Britain: Volume 6, Scotland, the Lowlands and the Borders, Newton Abbott : David and Charles. .

External links
Bathgate Historic Conservation Society
Commentary and video on Breich and Longridge railway stations

Railway stations in Great Britain opened in 1845
Railway stations in Great Britain closed in 1845
Railway stations in Great Britain opened in 1850
Railway stations in Great Britain closed in 1852
Disused railway stations in West Lothian
1845 establishments in Scotland
Transport in West Lothian